Dr. Theodor Neubauer (12 December 1890, Ermschwerd – 5 February 1945, Brandenburg an der Havel) was a German communist politician, educator, essayist, historian and anti-Nazi resistance fighter.

Biography

Early life 
Neubauer was born in the family of an estate inspector. His father was a German nationalist and monarchist and raised Theodor accordingly. He attended high school in Erfurt from 1901 to 1910, then studied history and modern languages for the next three years in Brussels, Jena and Berlin. He obtained a doctorate in 1913. From 1917 to 1923, he taught in Erfurt, then Ruhla and Weimar.

Of national-liberal tendency, he enlisted in the army in 1914 with the rank of lieutenant and fought on the Russian front where he was demobilized in 1917 after gas poisoning.

Indecember 1918, he joined the German Democratic Party, then turned to the left and became a member of the Independent Social Democratic Party of Germany (USPD) in late summer 1919, before joining the Communist Party of Germany (KPD) with the left wing of the USPD indecember 1920.

Communist functionary 
He was elected to the Landtag of Thuringia inseptember 1921. Also elected to the State Council in Thuringia inoctober 1923, he had to flee after the overthrow of the SPD-KPD coalition government which had been established there.

Having become editor of the Freiheit newspaper in Düsseldorf, he was elected a member of the Reichstag in the elections of 1924, re-elected in 1928, 1930, 1932 and 1933.

In 1930, he was elected member of the Central Committee of the KPD, responsible for foreign policy issues, and, temporarily, for social policy. In 1932, Neubauer published the book Deutsche Außenpolitik heute und morgen (German foreign policy today and tomorrow). Apart from his sociopolitical works, Neubauer also composed some 150 poems.

Resistance and death 
In March 1933, he went into hiding but was arrested on August 3. He was held in the prisons of Plötzensee and Brandenburg and the concentration camps of Lichtenburg and Buchenwald. Pardoned, he left Buchenwald early July 1939and returns to his family in Thuringia. He renews contact with the Communists of the region and set up with Magnus Poser, a carpenter in Jena, a resistance network. Until autumn 1943, the Neubauer-Poser network carried out actions in liaison with other communist groups, in particular the group of Anton Saefkow. He managed to communicate with the resistants of Buchenwald who receive weapons.

Following an illegal meeting in Leipzig, he was arrested in July 1944 and sentenced to death on January 8, 1945. Theodor Neubauer was guillotined on February 5 in the Brandenburg Prison.

Memory 

In East Germany, Theodor Neubauer was honored as an anti-fascist resistance fighter. Streets and schools were named after him and monuments erected in his honor. In 1969 the Erfurt/Mühlhausen University of Education was named after him. After 1990, these honors were withdrawn in most places. Since 1992, one of the 96 memorial plaques for members of the Reichstag murdered by the Nazis near the Reichstag in Berlin has commemorated Neubauer. In the memorial for the anti-fascist resistance fighters executed in the Brandenburg-Görden prison in Brandenburg an der Havel, Theodor Neubauer is mentioned as one of the four executed. The Dr.-Theodor-Neubauer-Medaille was established by the East German government in 1959.

His last known place of residence was the house at Lauchagrundstraße 13/Theodor-Neubauer-Park in Bad Tabarz, on which a commemorative plaque is attached and in front of which a stumbling block is embedded in the sidewalk.

Works 

 Die sozialen und wirtschaftlichen Verhältnisse der Stadt Erfurt vor Beginn der Reformation, Erfurt, 1913 (PhD thesis)
 Luthers Frühzeit. Seine Universitäts- u. Klosterjahre: d. Grundlage s. geistigen Entwicklung, Erfurt, 1917
 Deutsche Außenpolitik heute und morgen, Internationaler Arbeiter-Verlag, Vienna, 1932.
 Das tolle Jahr von Erfurt, Hrsg. v. Martin Wähler, Weimar, 1948
 Die neue Erziehung in der sozialistischen Gesellschaft, Verlag der Tribune, Erfurt, 1920 (republished Volk und Wissen Verlag, Berlin/GDR, 1973)
 Aus Reden und Aufsätze, SED-Bezirkskommission zur Erforschung der Geschichte der örtlichen Arbeiterbewegung, Erfurt, 1965

References

1890 births
1945 deaths
Members of the Reichstag of the Weimar Republic
Members of the Landtag of Thuringia
Independent Social Democratic Party politicians
Communist Party of Germany members
Buchenwald concentration camp survivors
People from Ruhla
People executed by Nazi Germany by guillotine
German Democratic Party politicians
20th-century German historians
German anti-fascists
Communists in the German Resistance
Executed communists in the German Resistance
German Marxist historians
German essayists